Chenar (also Romanized as Chenār) is a village in Dizajrud-e Sharqi Rural District of Qaleh Chay District, Ajab Shir County, East Azerbaijan province, Iran. At the 2006 census, its population was 1,173 in 279 households. The following census in 2011 counted 1,118 people in 272 households. The latest census in 2016 showed a population of 1,277 people in 370 households; it was the largest village in its rural district.

References 

Ajab Shir County

Populated places in East Azerbaijan Province

Populated places in Ajab Shir County